The 1996 United States Senate election in Virginia was held on November 5, 1996. Incumbent Republican U.S. Senator John Warner won re-election to a fourth term over Democratic challenger and future Governor and Senator Mark Warner (no relation).

Democratic primary

Candidates
 Leslie Byrne, former U.S. Representative
 Mark Warner, former Chair of the Democratic Party of Virginia
 Nancy Spannaus, independent candidate for the U.S. Senate in 1990

Results

Republican primary

Candidates
 John Warner, incumbent U.S. Senator
 James C. Miller III, former Director of the Office of Management and Budget and candidate for Senate in 1994

Campaign
John Warner, a moderate Republican who held this Senate seat from 1979, remained a popular and powerful political figure. A former United States Secretary of the Navy, he was at this time Chairman of the Senate Rules Committee.

He easily won renomination, despite opposition by a number of conservative Republicans, who distrusted him because of his moderate positions (Warner is pro-choice, pro-gun control and refused to support 1994 Senate nominee Oliver North due to his role in the Iran-Contra Affair).

Warner was endorsed by such notable figures as Bob Dole, George H. W. Bush, and Colin Powell, while Miller was endorsed by the NRA.

Results

General election

Candidates
 Mark Warner (D), businessman
 John Warner (R), incumbent U.S. Senator

Campaign
The two Warners (no relation) competed in a hotly-contested Senate election. The incumbent, who was a moderate Republican, was very popular and did not even face a major opponent in 1990. Although Mark Warner was relatively unknown, he became one of John Warner's strongest challengers. The Democrat self-financed his campaign and ended up outspending the Republican. In October, the Democrat outspent the incumbent 5–1.

The incumbent had to compete in a primary against a more conservative candidate because he had endorsed an independent in the 1994 U.S. Senate election, instead of controversial Republican nominee Oliver North. Despite this, North did endorse John Warner in the 1996 election. In the general election, the incumbent called the Democrat a "robber baron," "Carpetbagger," and a "Connecticut Yankee" who raised money from outside the state. Mark Warner tried to compete in the Southern part of the state, which is traditionally Republican territory. He earned the endorsement from the Reform Party of Virginia.

Polling
In June, the incumbent was leading 58%-24%. On September 19, the incumbent led 54%-34%.

Results

Analysis
Mark Warner lost the parts of the state that are outside the three largest metropolitan areas, 51%-49%, a very impressive result for a Democrat in this heavily Republican territory. However, John Warner's strength among moderates enabled him to carry Northern Virginia 55%-45%, which led to him winning the general election 52%-47%. This was the closest reelection margin of John Warner's career.

Aftermath
In 2002, John Warner was reelected with no Democratic challenger, defeating independent candidate Spannaus by a wide margin. He declined to run for re-election in 2008.

In 2001, Mark Warner was elected Governor, serving from 2002 to 2006. He left office with a high approval rating and many believed he was a potential candidate for the 2008 presidential election. After declining to run, he was mentioned as a potential vice presidential nominee. However, John Warner retired in 2008, and Mark Warner won the open Senate seat. John Warner would later endorse Mark Warner in his successful reelection campaigns in 2014 and 2020. This is the only time that Mark Warner lost an election in Virginia.

See also 
 1996 United States Senate elections

Notes

References 

1996 Virginia elections
Virginia
1996
Mark Warner